Saint-Gildas-de-Rhuys is a commune in the Morbihan department of Brittany in north-western France. Inhabitants of Saint-Gildas-de-Rhuys are called in French Gildasiens.

Its French name refers to Saint Gildas, who founded the abbey of Saint-Gildas-de-Rhuys on the Rhuys Peninsula in the 6th century. From 920 to 1008, the Norman raids forced the monks to bring the relics of the saint to the abbey of Saint-Gildas of Châteauroux that they founded under the protection of the prince Ebbes of Déols.

Burials
Saint Gildas (d.570)
Saint Felix of Rhuys (d.1038)
Saint Goustan (also called Saint Gulstan, d.1040)
Alienor de Bretagne, daughter of John I, Duke of Brittany (d.1249)
Jeanne de Bretagne, daughter of John IV, Duke of Brittany (d.1388)

See also
Communes of the Morbihan department

References

External links

 Mayors of Morbihan Association 

Saintgildasderhuys